Alàs i Cerc is a municipality in the comarca of Alt Urgell, Lleida, Catalonia, Spain.

References

External links
 Government data pages 

Municipalities in Alt Urgell